Potassium channel subfamily K member 15 is a protein that in humans is encoded by the KCNK15 gene.

This gene encodes K2P15.1, one of the members of the superfamily of potassium channel proteins containing two pore-forming P domains. K2P15.1 has not been shown to be a functional channel; however, it may require other non-pore-forming proteins for activity.

See also
 Tandem pore domain potassium channel

References

Further reading

External links 
 

Ion channels